Turk's Head is a 2010 French film.

Turk's Head may also refer to:

 Turk's head knot, a decorative knot
 Turk's head brush, a type of cleaning brush 
 Turk's Head Building, in Providence, Rhode Island, U.S.
 Turks Head, in Ross Island, Antarctica
 Turk head (heraldry), a heraldic charge
 West Chester, Pennsylvania, which was formerly known as Turk's Head

See also
 Melocactus, or Turk's cap cactus
 Echinocactus horizonthalonius, or Turk's head cactus
 Ferocactus hamatacanthus, or Turk's head